The 2018–19 Ukrainian Football Amateur League season will be the 23rd since it replaced the competition of physical culture clubs.

On 23 June 2018, the AAFU at its website published information about the upcoming its conference where AAFU plans to adopt its decision about the upcoming season including championship and cup competitions. The AAFU also provided a preliminary list of clubs that expressed their interest in the 2018-19 competitions. The format of the upcoming season was adopted at a conference on 29 June 2018.

Teams

Relegated professional clubs 
 FC Dnipro – 8th place in the 2017–18 Ukrainian Second League Group B (returning for the first time since 1950)

Returning/reformed clubs 
 VPK-Ahro Shevchenkivka (returning, last played season in 2015)
 Kolos Askania-Nova (returning, last played season in 2016 as Kolos Khlibodarivka)
 Dinaz Vyshhorod (returning, last played season in 2011)
 SC Khmelnytskyi (reformed from last season during which was known as FC Khmelnytskyi)

Debut  
List of teams that are debuting this season in the league.

FC Uzhhorod, Avanhard Bziv, FC Kryvyi Rih, Motor Zaporizhzhia, LNZ-Lebedyn, Kobra Ostroh, FC Halych, Ahron Velyki Hayi, Chaika Vyshhorod, Alians Lypova Dolyna, Ahrodim Bakhmach, Skoruk Tomakivka, Peremoha Dnipro, Kobra Kharkiv,

Withdrawn teams
List of clubs that took part in last year competition, but chose not to participate in 2018–19 season:
 Yednist Plysky
 FC Chernihiv
 Tavria-Skif Rozdol
List of clubs that withdrew during the season:
 Kobra Ostroh, was withdrawn and its record annulled. Kobra played six games tying only once and losing the rest with goals record of one goal scored and 22 allowed.
 Kobra Kharkiv was excluded from the number of participants of the championship according with decision of AAFU CDC #10 of 16 November 2018. In games of spring portion of competition to all opponents of Kobra Kharkiv will be awarded technical victories +:–. Kobra Kharkiv withdrew in beginning of November 2018 and played 11 games, losing all of them and in three already were awarded technical losses.
 On 15 March 2019 Rochyn Sosnivka announced that it withdraws from competitions of the AAFU. At the moment of withdrawal Rochyn had following record +5=2–4 (19–12).
 After 3 May 2019 Kolos Askania-Nova withdrew from competitions.

Location map 
The following displays the location of teams.

Stadiums
Group A
Group B
Group C

Notes:
 Alians plays its games in Romny at the stadium of former Ahrobiznes.
 The stadium is located in Baryshivka.
 Dinaz has two small Dinaz Stadium both of which located in Vyshhorod Raion, one in Lyutizh, another in Demydiv.
 Druzhba plays in Kryvyi Rih, while it is registered in Kherson Oblast.
 Skoruk plays in Dnipro while is from a small village of Tomakivka near the administrative border with Zaporizhzhia Oblast.

Group stage

Group 1

Notes
 On 20 September 2018 Kobra Ostroh was excluded from the competition on decision of the AAFU commission in organizing competitions. Its record was scratched.
 On 18 May 2019 Rochyn Sosnivka was excluded from the competition on decision of the AAFU commission in organizing competitions.

Group 2

Notes
 On 29 September 2018  the game between Fakel and Ahrodim was interrupted on 35th minute. The outcome of the game will be decided by the AAFU CDC. On 30 March 2019 the game was finished from the time at which it was stopped.

Group 3

Notes
 Kobra Kharkiv was excluded from the number of participants of the championship according to the decision #10 of the AAFU CDC of 16 November 2018. In games of spring portion of competition to all opponents of Kobra Kharkiv will be awarded technical victories +:–. Kobra Kharkiv withdrew in beginning of November 2018 and played 11 games, losing all of them and in three already were awarded technical losses.
 Druzhba Kryvyi Rih originally from Novomykolaivka after a winter break (24 April 2019) has changed its name (on decision of the AAFU Commission in organizing competitions) as it had played for the last couple of years in Kryvyi Rih.
 Kolos Askania Nova was excluded from the number of participants of the championship according to decision of the AAFU commission in organizing competitions of 30 April 2019. In games of spring portion of competition to all opponents of Kolos Askania Nova will be awarded technical victories +:–.

Play-offs
The first couple of stages (quarterfinals and semifinals) will be conducted home and away, the final will take place on a neutral field. The quarterfinals games are scheduled for 8 and 12 June 2019.

Quarterfinals

Semifinals
The draw for the semifinal round took place on 13 June 2019. Games are scheduled for 17 and 23 June 2019.

Final
The final game is scheduled for 28 June 2019.

|}

See also
 2018–19 Ukrainian Amateur Cup
 2019 UEFA Regions' Cup
 2018–19 Ukrainian Second League
 2018–19 Ukrainian First League
 2018–19 Ukrainian Premier League

Notes

References

External links
AAFU
The 2018–19 season's regulations. AAFU.
Kholodnyi, V. Ukrainian championship among amateurs. There became known the 1st round of the tournament's calendar (Чемпіонат України серед аматорів. Став відомий календар 1-го туру). Footboom. 29 July 2018

Ukrainian Football Amateur League seasons
4
Uk